Mardin is a city and seat of the Artuklu District of Mardin Province in Turkey. It is known for the Artuqid architecture of its old city, and for its strategic location on a rocky hill near the Tigris River.

The old town of the city is under the protection of UNESCO, which forbids new constructions to preserve its façade.

The city had a population of 129,864 in 2021.

History

Antiquity and etymology 

The city survived into the Syriac Christian period as the name of Mt. Izala (Izla), on which in the early 4th century AD stood the monastery of Nisibis, housing seventy monks. In the Roman period, the city itself was known as Marida (Merida), from a Neo-Aramaic language name translating to "fortress".

Between c. 150 BC and 250 AD it was part of the kingdom of Osroene, ruled by the Abgarid dynasty.

Medieval history 
During the early Muslim conquests, the Byzantine city was captured in 640 by the Muslim commander Iyad ibn Ghanm. In many periods control of the city changed hands frequently between different dynasties. Hamdan ibn Hamdun captured the city in 885 and it remained under intermittent Hamdanid control until the second half of the 10th century, at which point it became contested between the Marwanids and the Uqaylids, with the Marwanids probably holding the upper hand over this area. Marwanid control in the region was ended by the arrival of the Great Seljuks under Malik-Shah I in 1085, which inaugurated an era of Turkish political domination and immigration in the region. 

From 1103 onwards, Mardin served as the capital of one of the two main branches of the Artuqid dynasty, a Oghuz Turkish family who had earlier fought alongside the Seljuks. Many of Mardin's major historic buildings were constructed under Artuqid control, including several mosques and madrasas, along with other types of Islamic architecture. The lands of the Artukid dynasty fell to the Mongol invasion sometime between 1235 and 1243, but the Artuqids submitted to Mongol khan Hülegü and continued to govern as vassals of the Mongol Empire.

When Timur invaded the region in 1394, the local Artuqid ruler, 'Isā, submitted to Timurid suzerainty, but the region continued to be disputed between different powers. The last Artuqid ruler, al-Salih, finally yielded the city to Qara Yusuf, the leader of Qara Qoyunlu, in 1408–9, and left for Mosul. The city continued to be contested between the Qara Qoyunlu and their rivals, the Timurid-allied Aq Qoyunlu. In 1451 the Qara Qoyunlu besieged the city after it had been captured by the Aq Qoyunlu, but failed to retake the stronghold. Aq Qoyunlu rule thus continued in the city for the rest of the 15th century. Coins were struck here under the rule of Uzun Hasan and his son, Ya'qub. After Ya'qub, Aq Qoyunlu rule began to fragment, but Mardin remained the center of an independent Aq Qoyunlu principality for many years, while the Safavids in the east grew stronger. In 1507, the Safavid ruler Ismail I succeeded in capturing the city and the castle, expelling the local Aq Qoyunlu ruler.

During the medieval period, the town retained significant Assyrian and Armenian populations and became the centre for episcopal sees of Armenian Apostolic, Armenian Catholic, Church of the East, Syriac Catholic, churches, as well as a stronghold of the Syriac Orthodox Church, whose patriarchal see was headquartered in the nearby Saffron Monastery from 1034 to 1924. A Venetian merchant who visited the town in 1507 wrote that there were still more Christian Armenians and Jews in the city than Muslims.

Ottoman Empire 
After the Ottoman victory against their bitter rivals, the Safavids, at the Battle of Chaldiran in 1514, the balance of power in the region changed. The Safavid commander in the region, Ustajlu, was killed in the battle with the Ottomans and was replaced by his brother, Kara Khan (or Karahan). In 1515 Mardin briefly yielded to the Ottomans, but the castle remained under Safavid control and the Ottomans were forced to leave after a few days, leaving Kara Khan to re-occupy it. The following year, the Ottoman commander, Bıyıklı Mehmed Pasha, defeated Kara Khan and Safavid control in the region crumbled. The Ottomans besieged Mardin again, which resisted under the command of Kara Khan's brother, Sulayman Khan. After the Battle of Marj Dabiq in August 1516, Bıyıklı Mehmed Pasha returned with reinforcements from Syria and finally forced the city's surrender in late 1516 or early 1517. After this, Mardin was administered by a governor directly appointed under the Ottoman Sultan's authority. 

The city experienced a relatively tranquil period under Ottoman rule, without any significant conflicts or plights. European travelers who visited the city in the late 18th and early 19th centuries gave highly variable estimates of the population, but generally indicate that Muslims (or "Turks") were the largest group, with a sizeable Armenian community and other minorities, while Arabic and Kurdish were the predominant languages. 

The period of peace was finally halted when the Ottoman Empire came into conflict with the Khedivate of Egypt. During this time the city came under the rule of insurgents associated with the Kurdish Milli clan. In 1835, the Milli tribe was subdued by the military troops of the Wāli of Diyarbekir Eyalet, Reşid Mehmed Pasha. During the siege the city's Great Mosque was blown up. Between 1847 and 1865 the city's population suffered from a notable cholera epidemic, with the exact number of fatalities not known. During World War I Mardin was one of the sites of the Assyrian and Armenian genocides. On the eve of World War I, Mardin was home to over 12,000 Assyrians and over 7,500 Armenians. During the course of the war, many were sent to the Ras al-'Ayn Camps, though some managed to escape to the Sinjar Mountain with help from local Chechens. Kurds and Arabs of Mardin typically refer to these events as "fırman" (government order), while Syriacs call it "seyfo" (sword). After the Armistice of Mudros Mardin was one of the Turkish cities that was not occupied by the troops of the Allied Powers.

Modern history 
In 1923, with the founding of the Republic of Turkey, Mardin was made the administrative capital of a province named after it. Many Assyrian survivors of the violence, later on, left Mardin for nearby Qamishli in the 1940s after their conscription in the Turkish Army became compulsory. As the Turkish Government subdued the Kurdish Sheikh Said rebellion in 1925, the first and the fourteenth cavalry division were stationed in Mardin.

Mardin industrialized significantly during the 1990s, when inhabitants moved in greater numbers to the modern parts of the city that were developing on lower ground at the foot of the old city hill. Through a passed law in 2012 Mardin became a metropolitan municipality, which took office after the Turkish local elections in 2014. The city has a significant Arab population.

Geography 
The city is located near the Syrian border and is the center of Mardin province. The old city is built mostly on the southern slope of a long hill topped by a rocky ridge. The slope descends towards the Mesopotamian plain. The top of the ridge is occupied by the city's historic citadel. The newer parts of the city are located on lower ground to the northwest and in the surrounding area and feature modern amenities and institutions. Mardin Airport is located to the southwest,  from the old town.

Neighbourhoods 
The city is divided into the following neighborhoods: 13. Mart, Cumhuriyet, Çabuk, Diyarbakırkapı, Eminettin, Ensar, Gül, Hamzabey, İstasyon, Kayacan, Kotek, Latifiye, Medrese, Necmettin, Nur, Ofis, Saraçoğlu, Savurkapı, Şar, Şehidiye, Teker, Yalım, Ulucami, Yenıkapı and Yenişehir.

Climate 
Mardin has a hot-summer Mediterranean climate (Köppen: Csa, Trewartha: Cs) with very hot, dry summers and chilly, wet, and occasionally snowy winters. Mardin is very sunny, with over 3000 hours of sun per year. While temperatures in summer can easily reach , because of its continental nature, wintry weather is still somewhat common between the months of December and March, and it usually snows for a week or two.

Demographics 
The city's population is predominantly Kurdish and Arab, with significant communities of Syriac Christians (Assyrians). Official census data does not record the number and proportion of citizens from different ethnicities and religions, but a 2013 study estimated that around 49% of the population identified as Arab and around 49% identified as Kurdish. The city can be divided into three parts: the Old Mardin (Eski Mardin) which is predominantly populated by Arabs with some Kurdish and Syriac families, the Slums (Gecekondu) which are mainly inhabited by Kurds who have escaped the Kurdish Turkish conflict in the 1980-1990s and the New City (Yenişehir) where the wealthiest people live. The civil servants are mostly Turks, which constitute the minority of the city.

History
The English traveler Mark Sykes recorded Mardin as a city inhabited by Arabs, Armenians, and Jacobites in the early 20th century.

Ecclesiastical history 
A bishopric of the Assyrian Church of the East was centered on the town when it was part of the Roman province of Assyria. It was a suffragan see of Edessa, the provincial metropolitan see. It eventually became part of the Catholic Church in the late 17th century AD following a breakaway from the Assyrian Church, and is the (nominal) seat of three sees of the Catholic Church: the current Chaldean Catholic Eparchy of Mardin and two (now) titular sees under the ancient name of the town: former Armenian Catholic Archeparchy of Mardin, now Titular see of Mardin only, and former Syriac Catholic Eparchy of Mardin and Amida, now titular see (initially as mere Eparchy).

Economy 
Historically, Mardin produced sesame. Mardin province continues to produce agricultural products including sesame, barley, wheat, corn, cotton, and others.  Angora goats are raised in the area and there is small industry that weaves cotton and wool. Agricultural enterprises are often family-based, varying in size. The city was also historically an important regional trading center on the routes between Anatolia, Mesopotamia, and northern Syria. Nowadays, trade with Syria and Iraq depends on political circumstances.

Historical landmarks 
Mardin has often been considered an open-air museum due to its historical architecture. Most buildings use the beige colored limestone rock which has been mined for centuries in quarries around the area.

Mosques and madrasas 

 Great Mosque (Ulu Cami) of Mardin: The historic main congregational mosque of the city, probably first built in the 1170s under the Artuqids. It was destroyed by artillery explosions during Rashid Pasha's siege of the city in the early 19th-century and rebuilt afterwards, probably along similar lines as the original building. Only the north wall of the original mosque remains. The original Artuqid minbar (pulpit), made of wood, has also survived. An inscription on the base of the minaret records its original construction date as 1176, but most of the minaret above the base was rebuilt circa 1892, probably well after the reconstruction of the prayer hall.
 Sultan İsa (or Zinciriye) Medrese: One of the most impressive Islamic monuments in the city, dated to 1385, during the reign of Artuqid sultan Al-Zahir Majd al-Din 'Isa (r. 1376–1407). Built as a madrasa, it also includes a mosque (prayer hall) and a mausoleum, arranged around two inner courtyards. The mausoleum was likely intended to be Sultan 'Isā's burial site, but he was never buried here after his death in battle. It has an imposing entrance portal carved with muqarnas, and two ribbed domes over the mausoleum and the mosque that are visible on the city's skyline.
 Kasım Pasha (or Kasımiye) Medrese: Another major Islamic monument begun by Sultan 'Isa but left unfinished upon his death in 1407. It was completed in 1445, under Akkoyonlu rule. It is located to the west, just outside of the town. It has a large central courtyard, a monumental portal, and three domes arranged near the front façade.
 Emineddin Külliyesi: A külliye (religious and charitable complex), believed to be the oldest Islamic monument in the city, founded by Emin ed-Din, the brother of Sultan Najm ad-Din Il-Ghazi (r. 1115–1122). Il-Ghazi may have finished the complex after his brother's death. The complex contains a mosque, a former madrasa, a fountain, and a hammam (bathhouse).
 El-Asfar Mosque: Believed to be the remains of a former madrasa known as the Necmeddin Medrese (Nahm ad-Din Madrasa). According to tradition, sultan Najm ad-Din Il-Ghazi was buried here, placing its foundation to the early 12th century, although only parts of the original building remain.
 Şehidiye Mosque: Originally a madrasa, probably built in the reign of Artuqid sultan Najm ad-Din Ghazi (r. 1239–1260) or earlier. Heavily restored in 1787–88. The minaret was rebuilt in 1916–17.
 Latifiye Mosque: An Artuqid mosque dated to 1371, with a minaret added in 1845.
 Şeyh Çabuk Mosque: A mosque of uncertain date, built no later than the 15th century (the Akkoyonlu period) and restored in the 19th century.
 Reyhaniye Mosque: Mosque of uncertain date, probably of the Akkoyonlu or early Ottoman period (15th-16th centuries).
 Hatuniye Medrese or Sitt Ridwiyya Madrasa: Believed to have been built by the Artuqid sultan Qutb ad-Din Il-Ghazi II (r. 1175–1184), with a mausoleum that may have been intended for the sultan's mother, Sitt Ridwiyya (Sitti Radviyye). The building now serves as a mosque. Both the prayer hall and the mausoleum contain finely-decorated mihrabs.

Churches

 Meryem Ana (Virgin Mary) Church: A Syriac Catholic Church, built in 1895 as the Patriarchal Church, as the Syriac Catholic see was in Mardin up until the Assyrian genocide.
 Red (Surp Kevork) Church: An Armenian Apostolic Church renovated in 2015
 Mor Yusuf (Surp Hovsep; St Joseph) Church: An Armenian Catholic Church
 Mor Behnam or Kırklar (Forty Martyrs) Church: A Syriac Orthodox Church with a niche containing the remains of Mar Behnam. The building dates from the mid-6th century. In 1293 it became the Syriac Patriarchal Church. Residential annexes for the Patriarchate were expanded in the 19th and early 20th centuries.
 Mor Hirmiz Church: A Chaldean Catholic Church in Mardin. It was once the Metropolitan cathedral of the Chaldean Catholic Eparchy of Mardin, prior to it lapsing in 1941. Nevertheless, One Chaldean family remains to maintain it. The building, or at least its overall design, may date from the 16th or 17th century.
 Mor Mihail Church: A Syriac Orthodox Church located on the southern edge of Mardin.
 Mor Simuni Church: A Syriac Orthodox Church with a large courtyard. The building may date from the 12th century.
 Mor Petrus and Pavlus (SS. Peter and Paul) Church: A 160-year-old Assyrian Protestant Church, recently renovated.
 Mor Cercis Church
 Deyrü'z-Zafaran Monastery, or Monastery of St. Ananias, is 5 kilometers southeast of the city. The Syriac Orthodox Saffron Monastery was founded in 493 AD and is one of the oldest monasteries in the world and the largest in Southern Turkey, alongside Mor Gabriel Monastery. From 1160 until 1932, it was the seat of the Syriac Orthodox Patriarch, until the Patriarchate relocated to the Syrian capital Damascus. The site of the monastery itself is said to have been used as a temple by sun worshipers as long ago as 2000 BC.

Other landmarks 

 Citadel: The citadel occupies a long ridge at the city's highest point. It was probably first built under the Hamdanids (10th century), but its present walls were likely rebuilt in the Akkoyonlu and Ottoman eras, possibly with some reuse of Artuqid materials. Up until the 19th century it was densely inhabited, but is now occupied by a military radar station. The interior includes the remains of a small mosque.
 Mardin Museum: an archeological museum dedicated to the city's history, opened in 2000, housed in the former Syriac Catholic Patriarchate building constructed in 1895, next to the Meryem Ana Church.

House architecture 

Houses in Mardin tend to have multiple levels and terraces to accommodate their sloping site, giving the old city its "stepped" appearance from afar. They are typically centered around an internal courtyard, similar to other houses in the region. Larger houses, as well as other public buildings, tend to have stone-carved decoration around their windows. The courtyard of larger houses is often on the lower level, while the upper levels "step back" from this courtyard, giving the house an appearance similar to "grand staircase" when seen from the courtyard.

Politics 
In the 2014 local elections, Ahmet Türk of the Democratic Regions Party (DBP) was elected mayor of Mardin. However, on 21 November 2016 he was detained on terror charges after being dismissed from his post by Turkish authorities. A trustee was appointed as mayor instead. In the Municipal elections in March 2019 Türk was re-elected. But he was dismissed from his post in August 2019, accused of supporting terrorism. Mustafa Yaman, the Governor of Mardin Province was appointed as acting mayor.

Notable locals 
 Nabia Abbott 1897–1981, scholar of early Islam, papyrologist and paleographer
 Februniye Akyol, Syriac Co-Mayor of Mardin (2014–2016)
 Zeynel Abidin Erdem, businessman
 Muammer Güler, governor
 Malak Karsh, photographer
 Yousuf Karsh, photographer
 Sultan Kösen, the world's tallest living man since 2009.
 Ignatius Maloyan (1869–1915), Armenian Catholic Archbishop, Christian martyr
 Sarkis Lole, Ottoman Armenian chief architect of Mardin
 Murathan Mungan, poet and writer
 Aziz Sancar, scientist, 2015 Nobel Prize winner in Chemistry
 Mümtaz Tahincioğlu, head of TOMSFED
 Bülent Tekin, poet and writer
 Masum Türker, former Minister of Finance

International relations

Twin towns—Sister cities
Mardin is twinned with:

  Ljubljana, Slovenia, since 2003.

Sport In Mardin 
 Mardinspor
 Mardin 1969 Spor

See also 

 Shamsīyah
 Yazidis in Turkey

Citations

General sources 
 Ayliffe, Rosie, et al. (2000). The Rough Guide to Turkey. London: Rough Guides.
 
 della Valle, Pietro (1843), Viaggi, Brighton, I: 515
 Gaunt, David: Massacres, Resistance, Protectors: Muslim-Christian Relations in Eastern Anatolia During World War I, Gorgias Press, Piscataway (NJ) 2006 I
 Grigore, George (2007), L'arabe parlé à Mardin. Monographie d'un parler arabe périphérique. Bucharest: Editura Universitatii din Bucuresti, 
 Jastrow, Otto (1969), Arabische Textproben aus Mardin und Asex, in "Zeitschrift der Deutschen Morgenländischen Gesellschaft" (ZDMG) 119 : 29–59.
 Jastrow, Otto (1992), Lehrbuch der Turoyo-Sprache in "Semitica Viva – Series Didactica", Wiesbaden : Otto Harrassowitz.
 Minorsky, V. (1991), Mārdīn, in "The Encyclopaedia of Islam". Leiden: E. J. Brill.
 Niebuhr, Carsten (1778), Reisebeschreibung, Copenhagen, II:391-8
 Sasse, Hans-Jürgen (1971), Linguistische Analyse des Arabischen Dialekts der Mhallamīye in der Provinz Mardin (Südossttürkei), Berlin.
 Shumaysani, Hasan (1987), Madinat Mardin min al-fath al-'arabi ila sanat 1515. Bayrūt: 'Ālam al-kutub.
 Socin, Albert (1904), Der Arabische Dialekt von Mōsul und Märdīn, Leipzig.
 Tavernier, Jean-Baptiste (1692), Les six voyages, I:187
 Wittich, Michaela (2001), Der arabische Dialekt von Azex, Wiesbaden: Harrassowitz.

External links 

 Mardin Guide and Photo Album
 Mardin Weather Forecast Information
 The Spoken Arabic of Mardin
 First International Symposium of Mardin History
 GCatholic - former & defunct Catholic sees in present Turkey, each linking

 
Ancient Assyrian cities 
Cities in Turkey
Populated places in Mardin Province
Assyrian communities in Turkey
Catholic titular sees in Asia
Tur Abdin
World Heritage Tentative List for Turkey
Places of the Assyrian genocide
Kurdish settlements in Mardin Province
Arab settlements in Mardin Province